Marin Premeru (born 29 August 1990, in Rijeka) is a Croatian discus thrower and shot putter with a personal best of 63.38 in the discus and 20.59 in the shot put. With 22.79 metres, Premeru is the third best youth competitor in history in 5 kg shot put.

Premeru was coached by Ivan Ivančić.

Competition record

References

External links

1990 births
Living people
Croatian male shot putters
Croatian male discus throwers
Sportspeople from Rijeka
World Athletics Championships athletes for Croatia
Mediterranean Games silver medalists for Croatia
Athletes (track and field) at the 2013 Mediterranean Games
Mediterranean Games medalists in athletics
21st-century Croatian people